Michael Gregory Rouse (born April 25, 1980) is an American former infielder who played in Major League Baseball (MLB) in 2006 and 2007.

Amateur career
Rouse grew up in San Jose and attended Gunderson High School and Valley Christian High School. He initially played baseball for San Jose State University before transferring to Cal State-Fullerton. In his final collegiate season for the Titans, he was named to the all Big West team after hitting .377 with 12 home runs and 62 RBI. In 2000, he played collegiate summer baseball with the Brewster Whitecaps of the Cape Cod Baseball League.

Professional career
He was drafted in the 5th round of the 2001 Major League Baseball Draft by the Toronto Blue Jays. Rouse was traded to the Oakland Athletics prior to the  season.

His major league debut was memorable as he went 3-3 in legendary Yankee Stadium to help the Athletics gain a victory over New York on June 9, . However, on September 5 of that year, Rouse was designated for assignment. On September 13, Rouse was claimed off of waivers by the Indians. However, despite providing a reliable glove in the infield, he batted just .115 at the plate, and on August 6, 2007, he was designated for assignment.

Rouse signed a minor league contract with the Chicago White Sox on January 12, but was traded during the season to the Philadelphia Phillies. He retired at the end of the season.

References

External links

Baseball players from San Jose, California
Major League Baseball infielders
Oakland Athletics players
Cleveland Indians players
Living people
1980 births
Sacramento River Cats players
Buffalo Bisons (minor league) players
Charlotte Knights players
Lehigh Valley IronPigs players
Cal State Fullerton Titans baseball players
Brewster Whitecaps players
San Jose State Spartans baseball players